Igor Engonga Noval (born 4 January 1995), simply known as Igor, is a Spanish-born Equatorial Guinean professional footballer who plays for Liga Nacional club Futuro Kings FC and the Equatorial Guinea national team. Mainly a centre back, he can also play as a central midfielder.

Club career
Born in Santander, Cantabria, Engonga graduated from Gimnástica de Torrelavega's youth setup. He made his senior debuts in the 2012–13 campaign, being relegated from Segunda División B.

On 13 December 2013 Engonga joined Celta de Vigo, being assigned to the Juvenil squad. On 7 August 2014 he joined third-tier CD Tropezón, in a season-long loan deal.

On 31 July 2015, Engonga moved to Club Portugalete also in the third division. The following 16 July, he signed for Tercera División club UD Almería B.

In August 2019, Engonga joined Greek Super League Two club Doxa Drama FC.

International career
Engonga's paternal grandfather, Vicente Engonga Nguema, was born in Bisabat, Kié-Ntem, making him eligible to both Equatorial Guinea and Spain.

On 7 January 2015 Engonga made his full international debut, coming on as a substitute in a 1–1 friendly draw against Cape Verde. A day later, he was included in Esteban Becker's 23-man list for the 2015 Africa Cup of Nations, but did not play at the tournament, in which his country finished fourth on home soil.

Engonga scored his first goal for Equatorial Guinea on 6 June 2015, the only goal in the 17th minute to win an away friendly against Andorra.

International goals

Personal life
Igor is the son of former Equatorial Guinea national coach Óscar Engonga and the nephew of former Spanish international footballer Vicente Engonga.

Statistics

International

References

External links
 
 
 
 
 

1995 births
Living people
Citizens of Equatorial Guinea through descent
Equatoguinean footballers
Association football central defenders
Super League Greece 2 players
Doxa Drama F.C. players
Futuro Kings FC players
Equatorial Guinea international footballers
2015 Africa Cup of Nations players
Equatoguinean sportspeople of Spanish descent
Equatoguinean expatriate footballers
Equatoguinean expatriate sportspeople in Greece
Expatriate footballers in Greece
Spanish footballers
Footballers from Santander, Spain
Segunda División B players
CD Tropezón players
Gimnástica de Torrelavega footballers
Tercera División players
UD Almería B players
Spanish sportspeople of Equatoguinean descent
Spanish expatriate footballers
Spanish expatriate sportspeople in Greece
Club Portugalete players